Xiongmei is a town of Xainza County, in central Tibet Autonomous Region, China, located about  south of Siling Lake. , it has 10 villages under its administration.

References 

Populated places in Tibet
Township-level divisions of Tibet
Xainza County